Freeloader may refer to:
 Freeloaders (band), an electronic music act
 Freeloaders (film), a Broken Lizard film
 Freeloader (game), a board game created by Cheapass Games
 Freeloader boot disks, a series of video game boot disks (e.g. the Wii Freeloader)

See also
Cheating (biology)
Mooch (disambiguation)